The  is a Japanese international school in the Diplomatic Enclave in Islamabad. It is opposite to the British High Commission.

See also

 Japanese people in Pakistan

Notes

External links
 Islamabad Japanese School 
  
  
  
   (currently the URL has a redirect to another former site of the IJS)

International schools in Islamabad
Islamabad
Islamabad
Diplomatic Enclave, Islamabad